Mishima Dam is a gravity dam located in Yamaguchi prefecture in Japan. The dam is used for flood control and water supply. The catchment area of the dam is 0.4 km2. The dam impounds about 1  ha of land when full and can store 125 thousand cubic meters of water. The construction of the dam was started on 1992 and completed in 2001.

References

Dams in Yamaguchi Prefecture
2001 establishments in Japan